At the 1900 Summer Olympics in Paris, four events in rowing were contested, marking the introduction of the sport to the Olympic program. At the inaugural 1896 Games, the rowing competition was cancelled due to strong winds. The 1900 regatta was held on the Seine between the Courbevoie Bridge and the Asnières Bridge on 25 and 26 August. Two finals were held in the coxed four competition, with both finals being considered Olympic championships. Thus, there were a total of five rowing championships awarded.

Medal summary

Participating nations
A total of 108 rowers from 8 nations competed at the Paris Games:

Medal table

Coxswain mystery

In the coxed pair event, the names of the coxswains for six of the seven crews entered are not known. Most of these were young French boys weighing about 25 kg, which the French crews employed to their advantage. The winning Dutch crew decided, after losing their heat, that their own coxswain was too heavy, and they recruited a French boy to steer the boat for the finals. The lad, name unknown, is believed likely to be the youngest Olympic gold medalist ever (previously estimated as between 7 and 10 years of age). Some estimate the boy was likely 12 to 14 years old. One researcher has made a case that this unknown cox could have been Giorgi Nikoladze (1888-1931) of Georgia, a future scientist and promulgator of Georgian sport.

References

Further reading
 International Olympic Committee medal winners database
 De Wael, Herman. Herman's Full Olympians: "Rowing 1900". Accessed 26 February 2006.
 

 
1900 Summer Olympics events
1900
1900 in rowing